Richard Aldrich Babka (September 23, 1936 – January 15, 2022) was an American discus thrower. A former world record holder, Babka also won a silver medal in the discus event at the 1960 Summer Olympics in Rome.

He starred in football, basketball, and baseball in addition to track and field at Palo Alto High School before graduating in 1954. He subsequently attended nearby Menlo College and the University of Southern California (USC). Knee injuries eventually obliged him to withdraw from USC's football and basketball teams, but as a discus thrower he continued to climb toward the top of the world rankings.

Babka continued to compete as a discus thrower until 1969, when he retired to devote himself to various business pursuits. 

He later resided in California. Babka was also an artist with works on display with the Art of the Olympians, which was founded by fellow Olympic discus thrower and American Olympics teammate Al Oerter. He died on January 15, 2022, at the age of 85.

References

1936 births
2022 deaths
American people of Polish descent
American male discus throwers
Athletes (track and field) at the 1960 Summer Olympics
Athletes (track and field) at the 1967 Pan American Games
World record setters in athletics (track and field)
Olympic silver medalists for the United States in track and field
Palo Alto High School alumni
Sportspeople from Cheyenne, Wyoming
Sportspeople from Palo Alto, California
USC Trojans men's track and field athletes
Marshall School of Business alumni
Track and field athletes from California
Medalists at the 1960 Summer Olympics
Pan American Games silver medalists for the United States
Menlo College alumni
Pan American Games medalists in athletics (track and field)
Medalists at the 1967 Pan American Games